Kahala is a village in Kuusalu Parish, Harju County in northern Estonia.

Kahala watermill from 19th century was moved to Estonian Open Air Museum in Tallinn in 1962.

See also
 Lake Kahala

References
 

Villages in Harju County